Kristen Cox (born Kristen Eyring, Bellevue, Washington) is an American business executive, university fellow and instructor, keynote speaker, published author, trainer, consultant, and co-founder of The Fulcrum. Cox is a fellow and instructor at the David Eccles School of Business at the University of Utah.

Early life
Cox was born in Bellevue, Washington. While growing up in Utah, Cox gradually lost most of her vision starting about age 11 due to a genetic eye disorder.

Cox earned her Bachelor of Science in Educational Psychology from Brigham Young University

She served a mission for the Church of Latter Day Saints in Brazil.

She received an honorary Ph.D. from Snow College in 2019.

Career 
Cox worked as Secretary of the Maryland Department of Disabilities. She was appointed to a position with the Department of Education by President George W. Bush and held numerous positions with the National Federation of the Blind.
She ran as the Republican candidate for lieutenant governor of Maryland during the 2006 general election.

Cox served as the executive director of the Department of Workforce Services (DWS).

She was appointed executive director of the Utah Governor's Office of Management and Budget (GOMB) by Governor Gary Herbert in 2012. She served from 2012 to 2020.

Author 
Cox is the coauthor of Stop Decorating the Fish and The World of Decorating the Fish, both with Yishai Ashlag).  Stop Decorating the Fish is a business fable illuminating how leaders may spend significant time and resources on solutions that give only the illusion of progress without solving the root problem. Proceeds from both books benefit the National Federation of the Blind.

Recognition

 Governing Magazine's Public Officials of the Year
 Utah Community Foundation as an Enlightened 50 (2016) 
 Utah Business Magazine as one of the 30 Women to Watch (2012)  
 Days of 47's Pioneers of Progress Award for Business and Enterprise (2012)

References
Specific

1969 births
American politicians with disabilities
Brigham Young University alumni
Living people
Latter Day Saints from Washington (state)
American people with disabilities
American blind people
Blind politicians
American Mormon missionaries in Brazil
State cabinet secretaries of Maryland
State cabinet secretaries of Utah
Women in Maryland politics
Women in Utah politics
Female Mormon missionaries
20th-century Mormon missionaries
21st-century American women politicians
21st-century American politicians
Latter Day Saints from Maryland
Latter Day Saints from Utah
Maryland Republicans
Utah Republicans